Kutter Martin Crawford (born April 1, 1996) is an American professional baseball pitcher for the Boston Red Sox of Major League Baseball (MLB). He made his MLB debut in 2021.

Career
Crawford attended Okeechobee High School in Okeechobee, Florida, and played college baseball at Florida Gulf Coast University. He was drafted by the Boston Red Sox in the 16th round of the 2017 MLB draft.

Crawford made his professional debut in 2017, making a single start with the Class A Short Season Lowell Spinners of the New York–Penn League. He split time during 2018 with the Class A Greenville Drive and Class A-Advanced Salem Red Sox, making a total of 27 starts and compiling a 7–7 win–loss record with a 3.26 earned run average (ERA). Crawford returned to Salem in 2019, and was promoted to the Portland Sea Dogs of Double-A. He pitched in only one game after mid-July, and ultimately underwent Tommy John surgery in October 2019. He did not pitch professionally during 2020, due to cancellation of the minor-league season, and had surgery mid-year to remove bone spurs in his elbow.

Crawford began 2021 in Portland before being promoted to the Worcester Red Sox of Triple-A. On September 5, Boston added Crawford to their active roster. He started that day's game against the Cleveland Indians, taking the loss after allowing five runs in two innings. He was returned to Worcester the following day and removed from the 40-man roster. Between Worcester and Portland, Crawford made 20 minor-league appearances (19 starts), pitching to a 6–6 record with 4.28 ERA. Crawford was later named the recipient of the Red Sox' Lou Gorman Award. He played in the Dominican Professional Baseball League (LIDOM) during the offseason. On November 19, in advance of the Rule 5 draft, the Red Sox added Crawford to their 40-man roster.

Crawford was named to Boston's active roster to start the 2022 season. He was placed on the restricted list in late April prior to a series in Toronto, as he was apparently not vaccinated against COVID-19 (required to enter Canada); he rejoined the team on April 29 in Baltimore. On May 14, the Red Sox optioned Crawford to Worcester. He was recalled in June for a week, and again in early July. On September 4, Crawford was placed on Boston's injured list with a right shoulder impingement. Overall with the Red Sox during 2022, Crawford compiled a 3–6 record in 21 games (12 starts) with a 5.47 ERA while striking out 77 batters in  innings.

Personal life
Crawford is the younger brother of Jonathon Crawford, who was selected in the first round of the 2013 MLB draft by the Detroit Tigers.

References

External links

1996 births
Living people
People from Okeechobee, Florida
Baseball players from Florida
Major League Baseball pitchers
Boston Red Sox players
Florida Gulf Coast Eagles baseball players
Lowell Spinners players
Greenville Drive players
Salem Red Sox players
Portland Sea Dogs players
Worcester Red Sox players
Estrellas Orientales players